Ashdod Performing Arts Center  is a performing arts venue located in Ashdod, Israel. The building was designed by Israeli architect Haim Dotan, who also designed Sami Shamoon College of Engineering in Beersheva.

See also
Culture of Israel
Dance in Israel
Music of Israel
Architecture of Israel

References

Performing arts centres
Theatres in Ashdod
Buildings and structures in Ashdod